The Eppendorf & Science Prize for Neurobiology is a neurobiology prize that is awarded annually by Science magazine (published by American Association for the Advancement of Science) and underwritten by Eppendorf AG, laboratory device and supply company.  Entrees are reviewed by editors from Science magazine and the top 10% are forwarded to the judging panel. The judging panel is chaired by the Neuroscience Editor of Science and the remaining judges are nominated from the Society for Neuroscience.  The award was created in 2002 to promote the work of promising new neurobiologists with cash grants to support their careers. Each applicant must submit a 1000-word essay explaining the focus and motivation for their last three years of work. The winner is awarded $25,000 and the scientist's winning essay is then published in Science (the winning essay and the essays of the other finalists are all published on Science Online)

List (2013–)

See also

 List of neuroscience awards

References 

Science-related lists
Neuroscience awards